The 11th General Junta is the current meeting of the General Junta, the parliament of the Principality of Asturias, with the membership determined by the results of the regional election held on 26 May 2019. The congress met for the first time on 24 June 2019. According to the Statute of Autonomy the maximum legislative term of the congress is 4 years from the preceding election.

Election
The 11th Asturian regional election was held on 26 May 2019. At the election the Spanish Socialist Workers' Party (PSOE) remained the largest party in the General Junta but fell short of a majority again.

History
The new parliament met for the first time on 24 June 2019 and Marcelino Marcos (PSOE) was elected as President of the General Junta with the support of Podemos and United Left.

On 29 July 2019, with the aim of avoiding a very big mixed group, a new proposal for creating groups with only two members was allowed. This reform allowed United Left, Asturias Forum and Vox to have their own parliamentary group.

Deaths, resignations and suspensions
The 11th General Junta has seen the following deaths, resignations and suspensions: 
 29 May 2019 – Carmen Moriyón, leader of Foro Asturias and the number 1 candidate on FAC's list for the Central District, declined to take her seat in the General Junta after her party's poor results in the elections. She was replaced by Pedro Leal (FAC).
 24 June 2019 - Juan Vazquez, an independent politician and number 1 candidate on Ciudadanos' list for the Central District, resigned a few hours after taking his seat, after political dissagrements with Ciudadanos' new pact policy, among other things. Ana Rosa Fonseca, also an independent politician, was number 6 candidate on Ciudadanos' list, and therefore, she should replace Juan Vazquez as deputy. However, she declined to take her seat for similar reasons than the ones put up by Vazquez. Susana Fernández (Cs) replaced Vazquez on 12 July 2019.
 30 December 2019 - Ana María Coto (Cs) resigned after voting differently from her colleagues before the regional budget. On 4 January 2021, Cristobal de la Coba, who should replace Coto, announced that he will not be taking his seat. She was replaced by Luis Fanjul Villa on 7 January 2020.
 19 November 2020 - Lorena Gil (Podemos), spokesperson for Podemos, resigned due to political disagreements with her party, saying that there were "obstacles" that prevented her from doing her political job correctly. Ricardo Menéndez (Independent, Podemos) replaced her on 23 December 2021, after Jara Cosculluela (Podemos), who was up in the list, declined to take her seat.
 4 January 2022 - Laura Pérez Macho (Cs) resigned after various clashes with the regional leadership of the party. She was replaced by Manuel Cifuentes (Cs) on 26 January 2022.
 17 December 2022 - Ignacio Blanco (Vox) announced his intention not to lead his party in the 2023 Asturian regional election. He also resigned as deputy. His decision came a few days after 'El Español' reported that Blanco was behind a society that owned a shopping centre in Llobregat (Barcelona) that was about to close down precisely because of the debt generated by that society. Blanco told 'La Nueva España': "My law firm has been dedicated to debt restructuring since 2009, and I am a bankruptcy administrator in many cases". He added that his resignation had nothing to do with the issue, and that it was a personal one in order to return to his job as lawyer. Javier Jové (Vox) replaced him on 14 February 2023.

Members

References

External links
Official website of the General Junta
All members of the General Junta

General Junta of the Principality of Asturias
2019 establishments in Spain